Drinks are liquids that can be consumed. In addition to basic needs, drinks form part of the culture of human society. In a commercial setting, drinks, other than water, may be termed beverages.

Alcoholic

Alcoholic drink – An alcoholic drink is a drink containing ethanol, commonly known as alcohol, although in chemistry the definition of an alcohol includes many other compounds. Alcoholic drinks, such as wine, beer, and liquor have been part of human culture and development for 8,000 years. Many brands of alcoholic drinks are produced worldwide.
 Comparison of alcopops
 List of alcoholic drinks

Beer

Beer – beer is produced by the saccharification of starch and fermentation of the resulting sugar. The starch and saccharification enzymes are often derived from malted cereal grains, most commonly malted barley and malted wheat. Most beer is also flavoured with hops, which add bitterness and act as a natural preservative, though other flavourings such as herbs or fruit may occasionally be included. The preparation of beer is called brewing.
 Beer and breweries by region
 List of beer styles
 List of microbreweries

By country
 Beer and breweries by region
 Beer classification in Sweden and Finland
 List of beer organisations
 List of countries by beer consumption per capita

 Beer in Armenia
 Beer in Australia
 List of breweries in Australia
 Beer in Austria
 Beer in Belgium
 Beer in Canada
 List of breweries in Canada
 Beer in Azerbaijan
 Beer in Belarus
 Beer in Bosnia and Herzegovina
 Beer in Brazil
 Beer in Bulgaria
 Beer in Cape Verde
 Beer in Chile
 Beer in China
 Beer in Colombia
 Beer in Croatia
 Beer in Denmark
 Beer in England
 Beer in Finland
 Beer in France
 Beer in Germany
 Beer in Greece
 Beer in Hong Kong
 Beer in Hungary
 Beer in Iceland
 Beer in India
 Beer in Iran
 Beer in Ireland
 Beer in Israel
 Beer in Italy
 Beer in Japan
 Beer in Kazakhstan
 Beer in Kenya
 Beer in Mexico
 Beer in Morocco
 Beer in New Zealand
 Beer in North Korea
 Beer in Norway
 Beer in Poland
 Beer in Portugal
 Beer in Romania
 Beer in Russia
 Beer in Scotland
 Beer in Serbia
 Beer in Singapore
 Beer in Slovakia
 Beer in Slovenia
 Beer in South Africa
 Beer in South Korea
 Beer in Sweden
 Beer in Syria
 Beer in Taiwan
 Beer in Thailand
 Beer in the Caribbean
 Beer in the Czech Republic
 Beer in the Netherlands
 Beer in the Philippines
 Beer in the United Kingdom
 Beer in Tibet
 Beer in Turkey
 Beer in Ukraine
 Beer in Venezuela
 Beer in Vietnam
 Beer in Wales
 Beer in the United States
 List of breweries in the United States
 Beer in Ukraine

Cider

Cider – cider is a fermented alcoholic drink made from apple juice. Cider alcohol content varies from 1.2% ABV to 8.5% or more in traditional English ciders. In some regions, cider may be called "apple wine".
 List of cider brands

Distilled (liquor)

Distilled drinks – also known as liquor and spirits, a distilled drink is an alcoholic drink produced by distillation of a mixture produced from alcoholic fermentation, such as wine. This process purifies it and removes diluting components like water, for the purpose of increasing its proportion of alcohol content (commonly known as alcohol by volume, ABV). As distilled drinks contain more alcohol they are considered "harder" - in North America, the term hard liquor is used to distinguish distilled drinks from undistilled ones, which are implicitly weaker.
 List of gin brands
 List of liqueurs
 List of rum producers
 List of tequilas
 List of vodkas
 List of whisky brands

Cocktails
Cocktails – a cocktail refers to any kind of alcoholic mixed drink that contains two or more ingredients. As generally understood today, a cocktail requires at least one alcoholic component—typically a distilled spirit, although beer and wine are permissible—and one sweet component; it may also contain a souring or bittering ingredient.
 List of cocktails
 Beer cocktail
 Cocktails with cachaça
 Highball
 List of duo and trio cocktails
 List of flaming beverages
 List of martini variations
 Well drink
 Wine cocktail

Hard soda
Hard soda also known as Alcopop is a type of alcoholic drink that is manufactured in the style of a soft drink.

Wine

Wine – wine is an alcoholic drink made from fermented grapes or other fruits. The natural chemical balance of grapes lets them ferment without the addition of sugars, acids, enzymes, water, or other nutrients. Yeast consumes the sugars in the grapes and converts them into alcohol and carbon dioxide. Different varieties of grapes and strains of yeasts produce different styles of wine. The well-known variations result from the very complex interactions between the biochemical development of the fruit, reactions involved in fermentation, terroir and subsequent appellation, along with human intervention in the overall process.
 Glossary of wine terms
 List of wine cocktails
 List of wine-producing regions
 Outline of wine
 Wine tasting descriptors

By country
 List of Appellation d'Origine Contrôlée wines (France)
 List of Italian DOC wines
 List of Italian DOCG wines
 List of Italian IGT wines
 List of VDQS wines (France)
 List of wine-producing countries
 Wine in China

Alcoholic and Non-Alcoholic

Barley

Barley-based drinks – Barley is a member of the grass family, is a major cereal grain. It was one of the first cultivated grains and is now grown widely. Barley is used in various drinks and as a source of fermentable material for beer and certain distilled drinks. In a 2007 ranking of cereal crops in the world, barley was fourth both in terms of quantity produced (136 million tons) and in area of cultivation.
 List of barley-based drinks

Hot drinks
 List of hot drinks

Mixed drinks

Mixed drinks – a mixed drink is a drink in which two or more ingredients are mixed. Some mixed drinks contain liquor while others are non-alcoholic.

Non-alcoholic
Non-alcoholic drinks – The term non-alcoholic drinks often signifies drinks that would normally contain alcohol, such as beer and wine but are made with less than .5 percent alcohol by volume. The category includes drinks that have undergone an alcohol removal process such as non-alcoholic beers and de-alcoholized wines.

Zero-proof cocktails
A non-alcoholic cocktail or mocktail – a nonalcoholic drink consisting of a mixture of fruit juices or other soft drinks. Most are 0.0% percent alcohol by volume. The drinks are a popular choice for people who are not drinking alcohol in social settings but would like an elevated drink choice.

Caffeinated

Caffeinated drinks – a caffeinated drink is a drink which contains caffeine, a stimulant which is legal and popular in most developed countries.
 List of coffee drinks

Chocolate

Chocolate drinks – chocolate is a processed, typically sweetened food produced from the seed of the tropical Theobroma cacao tree. Its earliest documented use is by the Olmecs of south central Mexico around 1100 BC. The majority of Mesoamerican people made chocolate drinks, including the Mayans and Aztecs, who made it into a drink known as xocolātl , a Nahuatl word meaning "bitter water".
 List of chocolate drinks

Historical
 Historical drinks

Plant-based

Barley 
:Category:Barley-based drinks
 List of barley-based drinks

Maize
Maize drinks
 List of maize dishes#Beverages

Rice
Rice drinks
 List of rice drinks

Soft drinks

Soft drinks – a soft drink is a drink that typically contains water (often, but not always, carbonated water), usually a sweetener and usually a flavoring agent.  The sweetener may be sugar, high-fructose corn syrup, fruit juice, sugar substitutes (in the case of diet drinks) or some combination of these.  Soft drinks may also contain caffeine, colorings, preservatives and other ingredients.
 Craft soda
 List of brand name soft drink products
 List of soft drink flavors
 List of soft drink producers

By country
 List of soft drinks by country

By temperature
 Cold drinks
 Hot drinks

Brands and companies
Drink brands and companies exist worldwide. The drink industry refers to the industry that produces drinks. Drink production can vary greatly depending on the type of drink being produced. Innovations in the drinks industry, catalyzed by requests for non-alcoholic drinks, include: drinks plants, drinks processing, and drinks packing. Ready to drink packaged drinks are those sold in a prepared form, ready for consumption.

See also

 Drinking water
 Lists of drinks
 List of breakfast drinks
 List of drinking games
 List of energy drinks
 List of fictional drinks
 List of food and beverage museums
 List of foods
 List of lemon dishes and beverages
 List of lemonade topics
 List of microorganisms used in food and beverage preparation
 List of national drinks
 List of Bolivian drinks
 List of Brazilian drinks
 List of Korean beverages
 List of U.S. state beverages
 Water
 
 Blood Orange

References

Beverages